The Tournoi de France (French, 'Tournament of France') was a friendly international football tournament organised by the French Football Federation (FFF) that was held in France. There have been two tournaments: the first in February 1988 and the second in June 1997 (as a warm-up to the 1998 FIFA World Cup). Austria, Switzerland, Morocco and hosts France were the four participants of the first edition that was won by France after beating Morocco 2-1 in the final; and Italy, Brazil, England and hosts France were the four participants of the second edition, which was won by England with 6 points.

Results

Top scorers

See also 
Tournoi de France (Women)Cyprus International Football TournamentMalta International Football Tournament

References

External links 
Official website

International association football competitions hosted by Morocco